The 1999 Big South Conference men's basketball tournament took place February 25–27, 1999, at the Asheville Civic Center in Asheville, North Carolina. For the first time in their school history, the Winthrop Eagles won the tournament, led by head coach Gregg Marshall.

Format
All six teams participated in the tournament, hosted at the Asheville Civic Center. Teams were seeded by conference winning percentage. Elon and High Point were making their transition to the league during the season, and were not yet included as full members.

Bracket

* Asterisk indicates overtime game
Source

All-Tournament Team
Greg Lewis, Winthrop
Tyson Waterman, Winthrop
Leslie Ballard, Radford
Kevin Martin, UNC Asheville
Adam Larrick, Charleston Southern

References

Tournament
Big South Conference men's basketball tournament
Big South Conference men's basketball tournament
Big South Conference men's basketball tournament